The men's 100 metre freestyle was a swimming event held as part of the swimming at the 1912 Summer Olympics programme. It was the fourth appearance of the event, which had not been featured at the 1900 Games. The competition was held from Saturday July 6, 1912, to Wednesday July 10, 1912. Thirty-four swimmers from twelve nations competed. The event was won by Duke Kahanamoku of the United States, the nation's second consecutive victory in the event (tying Hungary for most all-time). Cecil Healy took silver, the only medal in the event for Australasia, the short-lived joint team of Australia and New Zealand. Another American, Ken Huszagh, took bronze.

Background

This was the fourth appearance of the men's 100 metre freestyle (including the 100 yard event in 1904 but excluding the Intercalated Games in 1906). The event has been held at every Summer Olympics except 1900 (when the shortest freestyle was the 200 metres), though the 1904 version was measured in yards rather than metres.

One of the four finalists from 1908 returned: bronze medalist Harald Julin of Sweden. Charles Daniels, the defending gold medalist who had also won at the 1906 Intercalated Games and taken silver at the 1904 Olympics, had retired. The favorite was Kurt Bretting of Germany, who had broken Daniels' world record earlier in 1912. An intriguing entrant was the Hawaiian Duke Kahanamoku, rumored to have posted phenomenal times which were unverified because of the distance from the American mainland.

Germany, Norway, and Russia each made their debut in the event. Hungary and the United States each made their fourth appearance, having competed at each edition of the event to date.

Competition format

The rules for the swimming events provided that each event would consist of heats, a final, and "a sufficient number of intermediate heats in proportion to the number of competitors." This led to confusion, as the organizers declared that there should be two intermediate rounds (for a total of four rounds) while the American team believed that there would only be one before the final and consequently did not appear for the semifinals. After some negotiation, a four-round competition was held, with a special heat in the third round for competitors who had missed races due to the confusion.

For each round, the top two swimmers in each heat advanced to the next round, along with the fastest third-place swimmer. In the case of a tie, all tied swimmers would advance (swim-offs would only be used in the final). Each race consisted of a single length of the 100-meter course, and any stroke could be used.

Records

These were the standing world and Olympic records (in minutes) prior to the 1912 Summer Olympics.

(*) 100 yards (= 91.44 m)

In the fourth heat Perry McGillivray set a new Olympic record with 1:04.8 minutes. In the fifth heat Duke Kahanamoku bettered the Olympic record of 1:02.6 minutes. Finally Duke Kahanamoku improved the Olympic record with a time of 1:02.4 minutes in the third semifinal heat.

Schedule

Results

Heats

The fastest two in each heat advanced. A tie for second in the seventh heat resulted in both swimmers advancing. In addition, the fastest third-place swimmer from across the heats also qualified for the quarterfinals.

Heat 1

Heat 2

Heat 3

Heat 4

Heat 5

Heat 6

Heat 7

Heat 8

Quarterfinals

Again, the top two in each heat advanced along with the fastest loser overall. Four of the qualified swimmers did not take part in their quarterfinal heats, and a fifth (Massa) did not appear due to a misunderstanding. Massa was later allowed to take part in the semifinals.

Quarterfinal 1

Quarterfinal 2

Quarterfinal 3

Semifinals

Further confusion struck the semifinals. Under the belief that the second round of the competition had been the semifinals, the American swimmers did not appear for the third round. This led to both semifinals being essentially walkovers, as the first had three swimmers and the second only one. Since the top two swimmers of each and the fastest third-place swimmer would advance, all four competitors had secured a place in the final before entering the water. Longworth swam in the first heat, despite suffering from what the official report referred to as "suppuration in the head".

The jury for the swimming events met and determined that a third heat should be held under special rules. If the winner of the extra heat were to beat the time set by the third-place swimmer of the first heat (1:06.2, a stiff pace but one which all three Americans had beat during the quarterfinals), he and the second-place finisher would advance. If the mark were not bettered, none of the swimmers from the third heat would advance. Massa, who had missed the quarterfinals due to a misunderstanding, was also allowed to start in the extra semifinal.

In the third heat, Kahanamoku not only beat Longworth's time, thus qualifying himself and Huszagh for the final, but bettered his own Olympic record which he had set in the first round. Huszagh out-touched McGillivray by a "hand's breadth" to take second place and the final qualification spot, though both finished well behind Kahanamoku and their own previous times. Massa did not finish the race.

Semifinal 1

Semifinal 2

Semifinal 3

Final

Longworth was unable to continue competing due to illness and did not start in the final.

Kahanamoku was clearly in control by the halfway point, with a tight race between Huszagh, Ramme, and Bretting for the next three spots with Healy close behind them. It was Healy who took the silver medal, though, as he swam by the other three near the finish. Ramme fell back to fifth while Huszagh and Bretting finished separated by "[o]nly a decimetre".

Results summary

References

Notes
 
 

Swimming at the 1912 Summer Olympics
Men's events at the 1912 Summer Olympics